Caterina Valente (born 14 January 1931) is a French-Italian multilingual singer, guitarist and dancer. She speaks six languages and sings in eleven. While she is best known as a performer in Europe, Valente spent part of her career in the United States, where she performed alongside Bing Crosby, Dean Martin, Perry Como, and Ella Fitzgerald, among others.

Career

She was born in Paris to Italian parents Giuseppe and Maria Valente. In 1955, she was featured on The Colgate Comedy Hour with Gordon MacRae. In 1958, she filmed the musical comedy Hier bin ich – hier bleib ich (Here I Am, Here I Stay) which featured a guest appearance by Bill Haley & His Comets. During Haley's segment, Valente sang a duet with Haley on a newly recorded version of his song "Vive la Rock and Roll".

Her brother—Italian musician, singer and film actor Silvio Francesco (1927–2000)—performed with her, sang many duets, danced, and played the clarinet in the shadow of his famous sister.

In the mid-1960s, Valente worked with Claus Ogerman and recorded material in both Italian and English that he arranged/conducted and/or composed on the Decca labels. and London  Valente was a favorite of singer Perry Como, making eight guest appearances on his NBC Kraft Music Hall television program from 1961 to 1966. In 1964–65, she was co-host (with Carol Burnett and initially Bob Newhart) of The Entertainers, a CBS variety show. She was a frequent guest on The Dean Martin Show.

In Germany, she was a major performer of Schlager music. There, she recorded Cole Porter's I Love Paris under the German title Ganz Paris träumt von der Liebe, which sold more than 900,000 copies in 1954.

Over the years, she has recorded or performed with many international stars, including Louis Armstrong, Chet Baker, Perry Como, Ella Fitzgerald, Benny Goodman, Woody Herman, Claus Ogerman, the Tommy Dorsey Orchestra, Sy Oliver, Buddy Rich and Edmundo Ros.

In 1959, she was nominated for a Grammy Award. Valente was a principal on the CBS variety series The Entertainers (1964–65). Valente also made three appearances on the Ed Sullivan Show.

In 1970 she appeared in the Royal Variety Performance at the London Palladium singing Before the Parade Passes By, and The Breeze and I.

A briglia sciolta, the Italian jazz CD recorded in 1989 and re-released in later years under the titles Fantastica and Platinum deluxe, was her best-selling CD worldwide. In 2001, she released a new album, Girltalk, with harpist Catherine Michel. She retired in 2003.

In 2019 her song "Bongo cha cha cha" was included in the soundtrack of Spider-Man: Far from Home, directed by Jon Watts, becoming viral and risen to new popularity.

In 2021 the song went viral on social media platform TikTok, thanks to its use for a trend that has collected over 250 million views, started from Latin countries and South America, and then popularized also in Italy and Germany.

Selected album discography

United States
 The Hi-Fi Nightingale, 1956
 Olé Caterina, 1957, (Decca DL-8436)
 Plenty Valente!, 1957, (Decca DL 8440)
 A Toast to the Girls, (Decca DL 8755)
 Schlagerparade, (Decca DL 8852)
 More Schlagerparade, (Decca DL 4035)
 À la Carte - Caterina Valente Sings in French, (Decca DL 4050)
 Arriba!, 1959
 The Greatest... in Any Language!, (Decca DL 4052)
 Golden Favorites, (Decca DL-4504)
 Rendezvous with Caterina, (Decca)
 Fire & Frenzy – Caterina Valente & Edmundo Ros Orchestra, 1960
 Classics with a Chaser, 1960, (RCA Victor LPM-2119)
 Super-Fonics, (RCA LSP-2241)
 Great Continental Hits, 1962. Decca
 South of the Border, 1963.
 Valente in Swingtime, 1963. Teldec
 Caterina Valente's Greatest Hits, 1965. Decca
 The Intimate Valente, 1966. Decca
 Strictly U.S.A., (London LL 3307)
 Songs I've Sung on the Perry Como Show
 I Happen to Like New York, (London LL 3362)
 Valente & Violins, 1964. (London 3363)
 Sweet Beat, (London PS 536)
 Valente on T.V.
 Silk 'N' Latin – Caterina Valente with Edmundo Ros & His Orchestra, 1969
 Love, 1972. (London Phase 4), Stereo

Brazil
 Serenata d'Amore
 A Poliglota da Canção
 Caterina - A Cosmopolita, Polydor 46065
 Caterina Valente com Edmundo Ros

Peru
Caterina Cherie, Polydor 46310

Argentina
Una Cita Con Caterina Valente (A Date With Caterina Valente), Polydor 24011, 10 inch LP
Olé, Caterina!, (Polydor 25019)
Un Brindis para las Muchachas, (Polydor 25048)
Bueno... Clásico... y Popular! (Classics with a Chaser), (RCA Victor LPM-2119)
Classics with a Chaser, (RCA Victor LPM-2119)

Colombia
Cosmopolitan Lady, (Polydor 46065)
A Toast To The Girls, (Polydor 46074)

United Kingdom
Great Continental Hits, 1962. Decca LK 4508
Valente In Swingtime, 1963. Decca SKL 4537
I Happen to Like New York, 1964. Decca LK 4630
Caterina Valente's Greatest Hits, 1965. Decca LK 4737
Nothing But Aces – Caterina Valente & Edmundo Ros, 1969. Decca PFS.4157
The World of Caterina Valente, 1971. Decca SPA 192

Australia
I Happen to Like New York, World Record Club S/4384, 196?
Great Continental Hits, World Record Club, 1967
The Best of Caterina Valente, SUMMIT Karussell SRA 250-548 (on the cover)/2430 032 (on the label)

Germany
Plenty Valente!, 1957. Polydor LPHM 43.037A Date With Caterina Valente, Polydor 45 517Olé Caterina!, Polydor 46 029 LPHMWeltschlager mit Caterina Valente, 1959. Polydor Sonderauflage Bertelsmann J 53503, 10 inch LPIhre großen ErfolgeKonzert für Frack und Petticoat - Classics with a Chaser, RCA LSP-2119Super-Fonics, RCA LSP-2241Caterina Valente & Edmundo Ros: Latein Amerikanische Rhythmen, DECCA BLK 16184-PCaterina in Italia, Decca BLK 16211-PCaterina on Tour, Decca BLK 16213-PCaterina Valente & Silvio Francesco: Deutsche Evergreens, Decca SLK 16 189 PPariser Chic, Pariser Charme, Decca SLK 16266 PI Happen to Like New York, Decca SLK 16 290Wenn es Nacht wird in den Städten, 1965. Decca SLK 16 345Portrait in Music, Decca SLK 16 420-PHappy Caterina, Decca SLK 16485-PDie großen Erfolge (Decca ND 103, Stereo)Schlager, Lieder & Chansons, Decca ND 182Schlager, Lieder & Chansons 2, Decca ND 557Caterina Valente & Edmundo Ros: Olé Mambo, 1969. Decca 79 505Caterina Valente & Edmundo Ros: Latin together, Decca SLK 16849-PIch wär so gern bei Dir, Decca 6.22003The Best Of Caterina Valente, Polydor 184047Tanz mit Catrin, HÖR ZU TELDEC HZT 514
 Ganz Paris träumt von der Liebe - Caterina Valente singt ihre Welterfolge, 1970.
 Bonjour Kathrin – Caterina Valente präsentiert ihre größten Erfolge, 1965Bonjour Kathrin, Karussell 635 106

Japan
 Cosmopolitan Lady, 10 inch LP
 Caterina Latin Album, 1963
 De Luxe Latin Album, 1966

South Africa
 Latein Amerikanische Rhythmen, 1960
 Du bist Musik, 1956 (45106 LPH - Polydor Sternchen)

Selected filmography
 The Big Star Parade (1954)
 Ball at the Savoy (1955)
 Love, Dance and a Thousand Songs (1955)
  (1956)
 Bonjour Kathrin (1956)
 The Simple Girl (1957)
  (1958)
 Here I Am, Here I Stay (1959)
  (1959)
 Snow White and the Seven Jugglers (1962)

Awards
(Incomplete list'')
 1961 Bravo Otto, "Female singers“ Gold (also 1960, 1962 and 1963 in Silver)
 1964 "Europremio" European TV Award, Venice, Italy
 1965 "O Globo“ Award for Best Foreign Singer of Latin American music, Brazil
 1965 "FAME Award", USA
 1968 Bundesverdienstkreuz 1. Klasse ("1st Class Cross of Merit"), Germany
 1972 "Officier de l'éducation artistique" Officer of Artistic Education, Paris, France
 1986 "Großes Bundesverdienstkreuz der Bundesrepublik Deutschland“ Grand Cross of Merit, Germany
 1966 Goldene Kamera, Germany
 1990 Bambi, Germany
 1991 Goldene Europa "Lifetime-Award“, Saarbrücken, Germany
 1995 Bambi "Lifetime-Award“, Germany
 1998 Platin Romy Lifetime Award, Austria
 2002 Echo, "Lifetime-Award“ Germany
 2004 "Premio GABARDI", Lifetime Milano, Italy
 2005 Honorary Bambi, Germany
 2022 Dancers over 40 Legacy Award, USA

References

External links
 
 
 Caterina Valente recordings at the Discography of American Historical Recordings.
 Discography
 
 Photographs and literature

1931 births
Living people
French women singers
English-language singers from France
German-language singers
RCA Victor artists
Polydor Records artists
Decca Records artists
Schlager musicians
Commanders Crosses of the Order of Merit of the Federal Republic of Germany
Singers from Paris
Women guitarists
French people of Italian descent